Kouachi is an Arabic surname. Notable people with the surname include:

Chérif Kouachi (born 1982), mass murderer of Charlie Hebdo infamy
Saïd Kouachi (born 1980), other mass murderer of Charlie Hebdo infamy

Arabic-language surnames